George Washington Carver High School was a public high school located in Spartanburg, South Carolina. This historically black school was named for George Washington Carver.

History 
Cumming Street Senior High School opened in 1926. In 1938, a new building was built and it was christened George Washington Carver High School. 

In 1964, the school encouraged its graduates to integrate Wofford College in Spartanburg, and a student, Albert Gray, succeeded in becoming the first black student at Wofford. 

In 1970, integration of public schools was forced by the federal courts. Carver merged with Spartanburg High School, which chose a new mascot and new colors. The Carver campus was changed to a junior high school.

Notable alumni
Ralph Coleman, former NFL player
Tim Hosley, professional baseball player
Kitty Black Perkins, former Chief Designer of Fashions and Doll Concepts for Mattel's Barbie line
Howie Williams, former NFL player

References

Public high schools in South Carolina
Historically segregated African-American schools in South Carolina
Historically black schools